Point of No Return is a 1995 Australian film about an ex soldier who escapes from prison to investigate his brother's murder.

References

External links

Australian thriller films
1995 films
1990s English-language films
1990s Australian films